Thomas F. Stocker (born 1959) is a Swiss climate scientist.

Born in Zürich, Stocker obtained a degree in physics at the ETH Zurich. He was active in research at the University College London, at McGill University in Montreal and at Columbia University in New York. Since 1993, he has been a professor and head of the department of Climate and Environmental Physics at the University of Bern.

The focus of Stocker's research is the development of models of climate change based on, among other, the analysis of ice cores from the polar regions. He significantly contributed to creating the "hockey stick graph" that shows a growing increase of global mean temperatures in recent times. Since 1998, he contributes to the reports of the Intergovernmental Panel on Climate Change, and is co-chairman of the IPCC Working Group I (assessing scientific aspects of the climate system and climate change) from 2008 to 2015.

In 1993, Stocker was awarded the Swiss National Science Foundation's National Latsis Prize, in 2009 the Hans Oeschger Medal of the European Geosciences Union and in 2017 the Marcel Benoist Prize. He is a Fellow of the American Geophysical Union and a member of the Academia Europaea and the American Meteorological Society.

Stocker is featured in the film Taking Earth's Temperature: Delving into Climate's Past.

In 2019 he became a member of the German Academy of Sciences Leopoldina.

External links
 Biography at the website of the University of Bern

Notes and references

1959 births
Swiss climatologists
Intergovernmental Panel on Climate Change lead authors
Living people
Fellows of the American Geophysical Union
Members of Academia Europaea
Academic staff of the University of Bern
Academic staff of ETH Zurich
Members of the German Academy of Sciences Leopoldina